The 1926 Mercer Bears football team was an American football team that represented Mercer University as a member of the Southern Intercollegiate Athletic Association (SIAA) during the 1926 college football season. In their first year under head coach Bernie Moore, the team compiled a 4–3–2 record.

Schedule

References

Mercer
Mercer Bears football seasons
Mercer Bears football